The Victory Bridge carries U.S. Route 90 (US 90) over the floodplain of the Apalachicola River in the Florida Panhandle, immediately below the Jim Woodruff Dam. It was originally built by the Masters and Mullen Construction Company out of Cleveland (Henry C. Masters and Claude F. Mullen). The original Victory Bridge, completed in 1922 at a cost of $1 million USD, is no longer used, having been replaced in 1994-1996 by a high-level bridge slightly upstream that carries the same name.

See also

References

U.S. Route 90
Transportation buildings and structures in Gadsden County, Florida
Transportation buildings and structures in Jackson County, Florida
Road bridges in Florida
Bridges over the Apalachicola River
Bridges of the United States Numbered Highway System
Bridges completed in 1996
Bridges completed in 1922
1996 establishments in Florida
1922 establishments in Florida